Lee Creek, a partly perennial river of the Hunter River catchment, is located in the Central Tablelands region of New South Wales, Australia.

Course and features
The river flows generally north northwest then north reaching its confluence with the Bylong River near . The river descends  over its  course.

See also

 List of rivers of Australia
 List of rivers of New South Wales (A-K)
 Rivers of New South Wales

References

External links
 

Rivers of New South Wales
Central Tablelands